Józef Kokot (24 August 1929 – 2 October 2018) was a Polish footballer. He played in one match for the Poland national football team in 1954.

References

External links
 

1929 births
2018 deaths
Polish footballers
Poland international footballers
Place of birth missing
Association footballers not categorized by position